Yuxarı Ağcakənd is a town in the Goranboy District of Azerbaijan. The town forms part of the municipality of Aşağı Ağcakənd. The village had an Armenian majority prior to the First Nagorno-Karabakh War and Operation Ring.

Toponymy 
The village was also previously known as Aghjakend Verin.

References

External links 
 

Populated places in Goranboy District